The Rio Grande Gorge Bridge, locally known as the "Gorge Bridge" or the "High Bridge", is a steel deck arch bridge across the Rio Grande Gorge  northwest of Taos, New Mexico, United States. Roughly 600 ft above the Rio Grande, it is the tenth highest bridge in the United States.

Construction
The bridge was started in 1963 and completed in 1965. It was dedicated on September 10, 1965 and is a part of U.S. Route 64, a major east–west road. The span is : two  approach spans with a  main center span.

Awards
In 1966 the American Institute of Steel Construction awarded the bridge "Most Beautiful Steel Bridge" in the "Long Span" category.

Restoration
A $2.4 million "facelift" to the bridge was completed in September 2012. This year-long project included repair and restoration work to the 50-year-old bridge including structural steelwork, a new concrete deck surface, new sidewalks, ramps, curbs, and gutters.

Suicide problem
The bridge has been the site of numerous suicides. Authorities are studying ways to deter suicides, including the construction of suicide barriers, such as higher fencing, netting, or more security, and also hotline buttons, but cite money as a major reason no steps have been taken.

Bridge height discrepancy
Although one of the highest bridges in the US, exactly how high the main span is above ground still remains up in the air.  When it was placed on the National Register of Historic Places in 1967, this distance was cited as 650’ over the Rio Grande.
And today that number is still widely used.
In 2010 however, the Highest Bridges Web Site came out with a substantially lower (565’) figure. This height was most likely derived using a laser range finder but the site did not specifically reference it that way.
Wikipedia used this 565’ figure in 2012 when updating its List of bridges in the United States by height, but kept the 650’ (200 meter) figure for the bridge in its Rio Grande del Norte National Monument article.
And then in 2015, a height of 600’ appeared on the scene.  An author of a bridge book noted this discrepancy and recommended this compromise number be used until the matter was authoritatively resolved.  This 600’ figure then cropped up in a January 2016 Materials Performance Magazine white paper about the bridge's then just completed inspection by the New Mexico Department of Transportation.

In popular culture
The bridge has appeared in several films, including Natural Born Killers, Twins, White Sands, She's Having a Baby, The Signal, Paul, Vacation, Wild Hogs, and Terminator Salvation.

Gallery

See also

 National Register of Historic Places listings in Taos County, New Mexico
 List of bridges in the United States by height

References

External links

Bridges completed in 1965
Road bridges on the National Register of Historic Places in New Mexico
Buildings and structures in Taos County, New Mexico
Open-spandrel deck arch bridges in the United States
Transportation in Taos County, New Mexico
Tourist attractions in Taos County, New Mexico
National Register of Historic Places in Taos County, New Mexico
Bridges over the Rio Grande
Steel bridges in the United States
Truss bridges in the United States
1965 establishments in New Mexico